Luge at the 2012 Winter Youth Olympics took place at the Olympic Sliding Centre Innsbruck venue in Innsbruck, Austria.

Medal summary

Medal table

Events

Qualification system
The rankings from the 2010–11 and 2011–12 Junior Luge world cup were used to qualify entries. The maximum total for an NOC is six athletes (2 boys, 2 girls and one doubles), with a maximum total of 20 athletes in the singles and 15 in the doubles. If the host nation has not qualified, the last quota spot is awarded to Austria. If an event does not have enough qualifiers, the quota spots left over will be allocated to the other events equally. A nation can enter the team event if it has qualified an athlete in each event. If spots are reallocated, first priority will be given to nations that have not qualified an athlete yet.

Boys' singles
Boy's standings

Boys' doubles
Doubles standings 

Only 11 countries were eligible for quota spots through the rankings.

Girls' singles

Qualification summary

References

 
2012 in luge
2012 Winter Youth Olympics events
2012
Luge in Austria